Bourtzi (from Ottoman Turkish and Arabic برج - burc meaning "tower") may refer to a number of fortresses in Greece:
 Bourtzi (Nafplio), in the port of Nafplio, the most famous of them
 Bourtzi (Aegina), on an islet off Aegina
 Bourtzi (Aulis), a ruined castle near Aulis
 Bourtzi (Poros), on an island off Poros
 Bourtzi (Chalkis), a now demolished Venetian fortress at Chalkis
 Bourtzi (Methoni), at Methoni, Messenia
 Bourtzi (Karystos), at Karystos